Hednotodes is a genus of moths of the family Pyralidae.

Distribution
 Australia

Species
Hednotodes callichroa  Lower, 1893
Hednotodes metaxantha  (Hampson, 1918)

References

Chrysauginae
Pyralidae genera